Scott J. Andreassi serves as District Attorney of Armstrong County, Pennsylvania.

He was elected District Attorney in 1997 in a close race against then Assistant District Attorney Bradley Hellein, the Republican nominee.  Andreassi was unopposed for re-election in 2001.  In 2005, Hellein again ran against Andreassi.  Andreassi won that year by a comfortable margin.

Prior to serving as DA, he was worked as an assistant Armstrong County public defender, Assistant to the Secretary/Treasurer of the PA AFL-CIO, Contract Administrator for the PA Nurses Association, attorney for the Airline Pilots Association, and as a private attorney as a partner in Steiner, Steiner and Andreassi.

Andreassi's assistant district attorneys are First Assistant, Katie Charlton and Tim Miller.  Andreassi's predecessor, Republican George Kepple, serves as Andreassi's Deputy District Attorney.

On May 3, 2016, the ACLU of Pennsylvania filed a federal lawsuit against Scott Andreassi for violation of the first amendment, false arrest and false imprisonment.

References

Year of birth missing (living people)
Living people
County district attorneys in Pennsylvania
Public defenders